Petter Gonzalo Rocha Lavandeira, known as Petter Rocha or Petter (born January 30, 1984 in Rivera) is an Uruguayan professional football player. Currently, he plays in Segunda División B for SD Compostela.

He played on the professional level in Primera División Uruguaya for Defensor Sporting.

1984 births
Living people
People from Rivera Department
Uruguayan footballers
Uruguayan expatriate footballers
Expatriate footballers in Spain
Defensor Sporting players
SD Compostela footballers
Association football midfielders